Opuntia leucotricha is a species of cactus with the common names: arborescent pricklypear, Aaron's beard cactus, and semaphore cactus; and (in Spanish) duraznillo blanco and nopal blanco.

Distribution
It is a species of Opuntia (prickly pear) that is endemic to Mexico. The cactus occurs in mountain habitats, in the states of: San Luis Potosí, Tamaulipas, Zacatecas, Guanajuato, and Querétaro.

Description
The platyclades have a thin fuzz of white hairs on their joints.

The plant is an invasive species in Florida.

References

External links

leucotricha
Cacti of Mexico
Endemic flora of Mexico
Flora of Guanajuato
Flora of Querétaro
Flora of San Luis Potosí
Flora of Tamaulipas
Flora of Zacatecas